Christina ("Stien") Wilhelmina Baas-Kaiser (20 May 1938 – 23 June 2022) was a Dutch speed skater.

Life
She was not selected for the 1964 Winter Olympics because of her 'old age' (25 at that time) but later turned out to be the first Dutch female world class speed skater. In both 1965 and 1966, she won bronze at the World Allround Championships. After having become World Allround Champion twice (in 1967 and 1968) – and also winning her 3rd and 4th Dutch Allround Championships those years – she participated at the 1968 Winter Olympics in Grenoble. Her two bronze medals – in the 1,500 m, behind Finnish skater Kaija Mustonen and Dutch compatriot Carry Geijssen, and in the 3,000 m behind compatriot Ans Schut and, once more, Kaija Mustonen – were a bit disappointing. Not she, but Geijssen (who not only won silver in the 1,500 m, but also gold in the 1,000 m) and Schut became the Dutch heroines of those Olympics.

Although she was still a formidable competitor in the years that followed, Kaiser was slightly surpassed at major championships by Atje Keulen-Deelstra, who was the same age as Kaiser. In 1972, by then married and 33 years old, Baas-Kaiser was no longer really considered to be a favourite, especially not after her disappointing 11th place at the European Allround Championships. At the 1972 Winter Olympics in Sapporo, Baas-Kaiser originally was not meant to skate, but since fellow Dutch skater Trijnie Rep had disappointed in the 500 m (finishing 20th) and the 1,000 m (finishing 24th), Baas-Kaiser was given a chance in the 1,500 m and the 3,000 m. And she turned it into something beautiful: On the 1,500 m, she won silver behind Dianne Holum, but ahead of Atje Keulen-Deelstra, and in the 3,000 m two days later, she became Olympic Champion ahead of Holum and Keulen-Deelstra. She ended her skating career later that year with a silver medal at the World Allround Championships.

Nationally, she won the allround titles in 1964, 1965, 1967–1969, and 1971, finished second in 1970 and 1972, and third in 1966. In 1967, she was chosen the Dutch Sportswoman of the Year. She was a niece of the Olympic speed skater Kees Broekman.

Records
Over the course of her career, Baas-Kaiser skated nine world records and twenty-seven Dutch records:

References

Notes

Bibliography

 Bal, Rien and Van Dijk, Rob. Schaatskampioenen, alles over het seizoen 68–69. Amsterdam: N.V. Het Parool, 1969.
 Bijlsma, Hedman with Tom Dekkers; Arie van Erk; Gé du Maine; Hans Niezen; Nol Terwindt and Karel Verbeek. Schaatsseizoen '96–'97: 25e Jaargang 1996–1997, statistische terugblik. Assen, the Netherlands: Stichting Schaatsseizoen, 1997. ISSN 0922-9582.
 Eng, Trond. All Time International Championships, Complete Results: 1889 – 2002. Askim, Norway: WSSSA-Skøytenytt, 2002.
 Froger, Fred R. Winnaars op de schaats, Een Parool Sportpocket. Amsterdam: N.V. Het Parool, 1968.
 Koomen, Theo. 10 Jaar Topschaatsen. Laren(NH), the Netherlands: Uitgeverij Luitingh, 1971. .
 Kleine, Jan. Schaatsjaarboek 1964. Deventer, the Netherlands, 1964.
 Kleine, Jan. Schaatsjaarboek 1965. Deventer, the Netherlands, 1965.
 Kleine, Jan. Schaatsjaarboek 1966, alles over het hardrijden op de schaats. Amsterdam, Drukkerij Dico, 1966.
 Kleine, Jan. Schaatsjaarboek 1967/68, alles over het hardrijden op de lange baan. Amsterdam, Drukkerij Dico, 1967.
 Kleine, Jan. Schaatsjaarboek 1968/69, alles over het hardrijden op de lange baan. Amsterdam, Drukkerij Dico, 1968.
 Kleine, Jan. Schaatsjaarboek 1969–'70, alles over het hardrijden op de lange baan. Ede, the Netherlands, 1969.
 Kleine, Jan. Schaatsjaarboek 1970–'71, alles over het hardrijden op de lange baan. Nijmegen, the Netherlands, Schaatsjaarboek, 1970.
 Kleine, Jan. Schaatsjaarboek 1971–'72, alles over het hardrijden op de lange baan. Nijmegen, the Netherlands, Schaatsjaarboek, 1971.
 Kleine, Jan. Schaatsjaarboek 1972–'73, alles over het hardrijden op de lange baan. Nijmegen, the Netherlands, Schaatsjaarboek, 1972.
 Maaskant, Piet. Flitsende Ijzers, De geschiedenis van de schaatssport. Zwolle, the Netherlands: La Rivière & Voorhoeve, 1967 (2nd revised and extended edition).
 Maaskant, Piet. Heya, Heya! Het nieuwe boek van de Schaatssport. Zwolle, the Netherlands: La Rivière & Voorhoeve, 1970.
 Peereboom, Klaas. Van Jaap Eden tot Ard Schenk. Baarn, the Netherlands: De Boekerij, 1972. .
 Teigen, Magne. Komplette Resultater Internasjonale Mesterskap 1889 – 1989: Menn/Kvinner, Senior/Junior, allround/sprint. Veggli, Norway: WSSSA-Skøytenytt, 1989.
 Van Eyle, Wim. Een Eeuw Nederlandse Schaatssport. Utrecht, the Netherlands: Uitgeverij Het Spectrum, 1982. .

External links
 

1938 births
2022 deaths
Dutch female speed skaters
Olympic speed skaters of the Netherlands
Speed skaters at the 1968 Winter Olympics
Speed skaters at the 1972 Winter Olympics
Olympic gold medalists for the Netherlands
Olympic silver medalists for the Netherlands
Olympic bronze medalists for the Netherlands
Sportspeople from Delft
Olympic medalists in speed skating
World record setters in speed skating
Medalists at the 1972 Winter Olympics
Medalists at the 1968 Winter Olympics
World Allround Speed Skating Championships medalists
21st-century Dutch women
20th-century Dutch women